Jinzhou (锦州) is a prefecture-level city in Liaoning, China.

Jinzhou—an atonal pinyin romanization of various Chinese prefectures or prefectural seats—may also refer to:

Prefectures
 Jin Prefecture (Shaanxi) (金州), a former imperial prefecture
 Jin Prefecture (Shanxi) (晋州), a former imperial prefecture
 Jin Prefecture (Hunan) (锦州), a former imperial prefecture

Towns
Jinzhou, Hebei (晋州), a county-level city in Hebei, China
Jinzhou, Jinzhou, in Jinzhou, Hebei, China
Jinzhou, Ningxiang, in Ningxiang, Hunan, China
Jinzhou, a former name of Ankang, Shaanxi
Jinzhou, a former name of Linfen, Shanxi
Jinzhou, a former name of Luyang, Hunan
Jinzhou Township (金洲乡), a township in Dongliao County, Jilin, China

Districts
Jinzhou District (金州区), a district in Dalian, Liaoning, China
Jinzhou New Area, a development zone in Jinzhou District

Other
Jinzhou Station (Guangzhou Metro) on the Guangzhou Metro

See also
Jin (disambiguation)
Jingzhou (disambiguation)